is a Japanese voice actress and singer affiliated with Axl One. 

In March 2016, she won the Best Lead Actress Award in the 10th Seiyu Awards for her leading roles as Jun Naruse in the box office hit The Anthem of the Heart and as Yuki Takeya in the anime television series School-Live!. Her other major roles include Kirarin/Ciel Kirahoshi/Cure Parfait in Kirakira Pretty Cure a la Mode, Chino in Is the Order a Rabbit?, Noel in Celestial Method, Hestia in Is It Wrong to Try to Pick Up Girls in a Dungeon?, Rem in Re:Zero − Starting Life in Another World, Chito in Girls' Last Tour, Shoko Makinohara in Rascal Does Not Dream of Bunny Girl Senpai and Rascal Does Not Dream of a Dreaming Girl, Tamaki "Kimari" Mari in A Place Further than the Universe, Itsuki Nakano in The Quintessential Quintuplets and Jeanne in The Case Study of Vanitas. Mabushina in Mashin Sentai Kiramager is her most well-known live-action role.

Her singing role is signed with King Records label as of December 2015.

Early life and education
Minase was born in Tokyo on December 2, 1995. She had begun watching anime when she was in kindergarten. She first became aware of voice acting when, after watching a stage play adaptation of an anime, she read the stage pamphlet and asked her parents about the name of a person mentioned in it. She wanted to become a voice actor from the age of six, and at elementary school she listed voiced acting as her desired career.

Minase joined her middle school's tennis and theater clubs. She quit the theater club because she felt too embarrassed to appear on stage. Around that time, her mother found a magazine advertisement for a voice-acting audition, which she passed.

Acting career
Minase made her debut as a voice actor in 2010, voicing the character Akari Okamoto in the anime series Occult Academy. She then voiced minor roles in anime in the 2013 series Love Lab and the 2014 anime series Aldnoah.Zero. Her first main roles came later in 2014 as Mirai Nazukari in Locodol and Chino Kafū in Is the Order a Rabbit?, as well as Jun Naruse in the animated film The Anthem of the Heart. Minase and her co-stars from Is the Order a Rabbit? performed the songs "Daydream Café" and "Poppin Jump", which are used as the series' opening and closing themes, respectively.

In 2015, Minase voiced Hestia in the anime series Is It Wrong to Try to Pick Up Girls in a Dungeon?. She also played Yuki Takeya in School-Live!, Carol Malus Dienheim in Symphogear GX, and Nekone in Utawarerumono: Itsuwari no Kamen Later that year, she won the Best Lead Actress Award at the 10th Seiyu Awards for her roles as Jun Naruse and Yuki Takeya.

In 2016, she voiced Rem in Re:Zero − Starting Life in Another World and also performed the insert song "Wishing", which was used in the series' eighteenth episode. She also played Shamille Kitra Katvarnmaninik in Alderamin on the Sky, Fuuka Reventon in ViVid Strike!, Mana Asuha in Luck & Logic, and Akane Segawa in And you thought there is never a girl online?. In 2017, she voiced Meteora Österreich in Re:Creators, Tapris Sugarbell Chisaki in Gabriel DropOut, Chizuru Takano in Tsuredure Children, and Yoshino Koiwai in Masamune-kun's Revenge. In 2018, she voiced Mari Tamaki in A Place Further than the Universe, and with her co-stars performed the series' closing theme "Koko Kara, Koko Kara".

Music career

Minase made her solo music debut in 2015, affiliating with King Records. She released her first single  on December 2, 2015; the single peaked at 11th place on the Oricon Weekly Singles Chart and stayed on the chart for 10 weeks. She released her second single, "Harmony Ribbon" which was released on April 13, 2016; it peaked at tenth place on the Oricon Weekly Single Chart. On November 25, 2016, Sony Music Artists and King Records announced that they were cancelling several events for her after she received a death threat online. The threat came from Taiwan.

She released her third single, "Starry Wish" on November 9, 2016; the single peaked at eighth place on the Oricon Weekly Singles Chart. "Starry Wish" was used as the ending theme song for the anime ViVid Strike!.

She released her first full album, which is titled "Innocent Flower" and was released on April 5, 2017; it peaked at third on the Oricon Weekly Albums Chart and stayed on the chart for 10 weeks.

Her fourth single,  was released on August 9, 2017; the single peaked at 12th place on the Oricon Weekly Singles. The song in the single was used as the opening theme song for the anime, Tsuredure Children. Her fifth single, "Ready Steady Go!" was released on December 11, 2017; it peaked at 9th place on the Oricon Weekly Singles Chart.

On December 2, 2017, Inori Minase held her first live concert, which was titled "Inori Minase 1st LIVE Ready Ready Go!", in Tokyo International Forum Hall . Her official fanclub, was launched on the same day. A blu-ray recording of the concert was released on April 4, 2018; it peaked on 6th place on the Oricon Weekly Blu-ray Chart.

In 2018, she participated in the "KIRIN LEMON Tribute" project to celebrate the 90th anniversary of Kirin Beverage's long-selling carbonated drink brand Kirin Lemon as the third artist following the idol group "BiSH" and the rock band "Frederick".

Her 2nd full album named "BLUE COMPASS" was released on May 23, 2018; it peaked at 7th place on the Oricon Weekly Album Chart. The lead track "Million Futures" from her 2nd full album was used as the theme song for the new chapter of Square Enix's smartphone app Kai-ri-Sei Million Arthur.

She held her first solo live tour entitled, "Inori Minase LIVE TOUR 2018 BLUE COMPASS", at 4 major cities across Japan starting on 9 June. The tour is named after her second album, BLUE COMPASS, which was released in May. She also announced about her joining King Super Live 2018 at Tokyo Dome on 24 September and in Taiwan on 30 September. A blu-ray edition of the tour was released on October 17 of the same year the live tour was held; it peaked at 3rd place Oricon Weekly Blu-ray Chart. It also won the first place in the Oricon Weekly Music DVD · BD rankings.

She held her second live tour, which was titled "Inori Minase LIVE TOUR 2018 BLUE COMPASS", at three major cities in Japan starting on June 16, 2018. The final live tour was held at Nippon Budokan. This was the first time she had a live show at Budokan alone.

Her sixth single, "TRUST IN ETERNITY" was released on October 17, 2018; it peaked at tenth place on the Oricon Weekly Singles Chart. The titular song was used as the theme song for Square Enix and Aiming's co-produced smartphone game GESTALT ODIN.

Her seventh single, "Wonder Caravan!" was released on January 23, 2019; it peaked at seventh place on the Oricon Weekly Singles Chart. The titular song from the single was used as the ending theme song for the anime Endro.

Her third album named "Catch the Rainbow!" was released on April 10, 2019; it peaked at 6th place on the Oricon Weekly Album Chart. Minase participated in the selection of songs and also conveys requests for lyrics and composition, and in the production of albums, her opinion is also reflected on the theme and title. She wrote the album's title track.

On June 26, 2019; she released her first music clip collection "Inori Minase MUSIC CLIP BOX".

Her eighth single, "Kokoro Somali", was released on February 5, 2020; it peaked at 5th place on the Oricon Weekly Album Chart. The titular song from the single was used as the ending theme song for the anime Somali and the Forest Spirit.

Filmography

Anime series

Original video animation

Original net animation

Anime films

Video games

Dubbing

TV drama

Live-action films

Other
{| class="wikitable" style="font-size: 90%;"
! Year
! Title
! Role
! Other notes
|-
| 2013 || CeVIO Creative Studio ||Sato Sasara ||
|}

Discography
Albums

 Singles 

Video releases

 Concerts 

 Personal concerts 
 2017: Inori Minase 1st LIVE Ready Steady Go! 2018: Inori Minase LIVE TOUR 2018 BLUE COMPASS 2019: Inori Minase LIVE TOUR 2019 Catch the Rainbow! 2021: Inori Minase LIVE TOUR 2021 HELLO HORIZON 2022: Inori Minase LIVE TOUR 2022 glow''

References

External links
  
 

1995 births
Living people
Anime singers
Japanese women pop singers
Japanese lyricists
Japanese video game actresses
Japanese voice actresses
King Records (Japan) artists
Singers from Tokyo
Voice actresses from Tokyo
21st-century Japanese actresses
21st-century Japanese singers
21st-century Japanese women singers